Paoline Salagnac (born 13 March 1984) is a French basketball player for CJM Bourges Basket and the French national team, where she participated at the 2014 FIBA World Championship.

References

1984 births
Living people
People from Tulle
French women's basketball players
Guards (basketball)
Sportspeople from Corrèze